Fenestra is a genus of grasshoppers in the subfamily Gomphocerinae with species found in South America.

Species
The following species are recognised in the genus Fenestra:

 Fenestra bohlsii Giglio-Tos, 1895
 Fenestra ensicorne Rehn, 1913
 Fenestra orientalis (Bruner, 1913)
 Fenestra platyceps (Hebard, 1924)

References 

Acrididae